Galsi Assembly constituency is an assembly constituency in Purba Bardhaman district in the Indian state of West Bengal. It is reserved for scheduled castes.

Overview
As per orders of the Delimitation Commission, No. 274 Galsi (SC) assembly constituency covers Galsi I community development block, Galsi and Kurkuba gram panchayats of Galsi II CD Block and Kanksa, Trilokchandrapur, Bankati and Bidbehar gram panchayats of Kanksa CD Block.

Galsi assembly segment was earlier part of Durgapur (Lok Sabha constituency). As per orders of Delimitation Commission it is part of No. 39 Bardhaman-Durgapur (Lok Sabha constituency).

Members of Legislative Assembly

Election results

2021

2016

2014 By election
In the Galsi seat, the by-election was held due to the sitting MLA, Sunil Kumar Mandal of the  Forward Bloc, who switched to Trinamool Congress. This Election was held on 30 April 2014.

2011

.# Trinamool Congress did not contest this seat in 2006.

1977-2006
In 2006 and 2001 assembly elections, Mehbub Mondal of Forward Bloc won the Galsi assembly seat defeating his nearest rivals  Anil Kumar Saha of BJP and Ajijul Haque Mondal of Congress  respectively. Contests in most years were multi cornered but only winners and runners are being mentioned. In 1996 and 1991, Idrish Mondal of Forward Block defeated Syed Imdad Ali and Champak (both of Congress) respectively. In 1987, 1982 and 1977, Deb Ranjan Sen of Forward Block defeated Ajit Bandopadhyay, Himanshu Baran Roy and Nirmalendu Koner (all of Congress) respectively.

1952-1972
Aswini Roy of CPI won the seat in 1972. Anil Roy of CPI(M) won it in 1971. Phakir Chandra Roy (Independent) won it in 1969 and 1967. Kanai Lal Das of Congress won it in 1962. In 1957 and 1952, Galsi was a constituency with two seats. In 1957, Phakir Chandra Roy (Independent) and Pramathanath Dhibar of Forward Bloc won the seats. In independent India's first election in 1951, Mahitosh Saha and Jadabendra Nath Panja, both of Congress, won the seats.

References

Assembly constituencies of West Bengal
Politics of Purba Bardhaman district